Orthogonius malaisei is a species of ground beetle in the subfamily Orthogoniinae. It was described by Andrewes in 1947.

References

malaisei
Beetles described in 1947